The 1980–81 Western Kentucky Hilltoppers men's basketball team represented Western Kentucky University during the 1980–81 NCAA Division I men's basketball season. The Hilltoppers were members of the Ohio Valley Conference and led by OVC Coach of the Year Clem Haskins, in his first season as head coach.  WKU won the OVC regular season and tournament championships and received the conference's automatic bid to the 1981 NCAA Division I Basketball Tournament.  Craig McCormick and Tony Wilson made the All-OVC Team, and Wilson and Percy White were selected to the OVC Tournament Team.

Cultural relevance
Haskins broke the color barrier this season at Western Kentucky, becoming the first African American head coach in school history.  This came 16 years after he, and Dwight Smith, became the first African Americans to play Hilltopper basketball.

Schedule

|-
!colspan=6| Regular season

|-

 

|-
!colspan=6| 1981 Ohio Valley Conference Men's Basketball Tournament

|-
!colspan=6| 1981 NCAA Division I Basketball Tournament

References

Western Kentucky Hilltoppers basketball seasons
Western Kentucky
Western Kentucky
Western Kentucky Basketball, Men's
Western Kentucky Basketball, Men's